Novăceşti may refer to several villages in Romania:

 Novăceşti, a village in Bistra Commune, Alba County
 Novăceşti, a village in Floreşti Commune, Prahova County